"Fly (Through the Starry Night)" is a song by Dutch Eurodance group 2 Brothers on the 4th Floor featuring rapper D-Rock and singer Des'Ray. It was released in 1995 as the first single from their second album, 2 (1996). In Europe, it peaked at number six in the Netherlands and number 19 in Belgium, while on the Eurochart Hot 100, the song reached number 70 in May 1995. Outside Europe, it peaked at number-one in Israel for two weeks. In 2014, it was released in the Netherlands in a new remix by Jaz Von D (aka Jasper Kuijper).

Track listing
 CD single, Netherlands (1995)
"Fly (Through the Starry Night)" (Radio Version) – 3:21
"Fly (Through the Starry Night)" (Lick Mix) – 6:48

 CD maxi, Netherlands (1995)
"Fly (Through the Starry Night)" (Radio Version) – 3:26
"Fly (Through the Starry Night)" (Lick Mix) – 6:48
"Fly (Through the Starry Night)" (Beats 'R' Us Mix) – 3:12
"Fly (Through the Starry Night)" (Extended Version) – 5:06 

 CD maxi (The Remixes), Netherlands (1995)
"Fly (Through the Starry Night)" (C.C.Q.T. Radio Edit) – 3:50
"Fly (Through the Starry Night)" (C.C.Q.T. Extended Mix) – 6:15
"Fly (Through the Starry Night)" (Mars Plastic Mix) – 6:20
"Fly (Through the Starry Night)" (Happy Hardcore Mix) – 4:35

Charts

Weekly charts

Year-end charts

References

1995 singles
1995 songs
2 Brothers on the 4th Floor songs
CNR Music singles
Electro songs
English-language Dutch songs
Number-one singles in Israel